Safar Kheyl (also Romanized as Şafar Kheyl; also known as Aşafar Kheyl) is a village in Siyahrud Rural District, in the Central District of Juybar County, Mazandaran Province, Iran. At the 2006 census, its population was 253, in 67 families.

References 

Populated places in Juybar County